Christia is a genus of flowering plants in the legume family, Fabaceae. It belongs to the subfamily Faboideae.

Geographical distribution 
Tropical & Subtropical Asia, including

 Ryukyu Island 
 Taiwan 
 Indochina 
 Malaysia 
 Indonesia 
 Vietnam 
 Laos 
 Cambodia 
 Thailand 
 India 
 China  
 Northern Australia

The genus is also naturalized in Fiji and on some Caribbean islands such as St. Vincent, Martinique, Jamaica and St. Kitts.

Species 

 Christia australasica (Schindl.) Bakh.f
 Christia constricta (Schindl.) T.C.Chen
 Christia convallaria (Schindl.) Ohashi
 Christia hainanensis Yen C.Yang & P.H.Huang
 Christia lychnucha (Schindl.) Ohashi
 Christia obcordata (Poir.) Bakh.f.
 Christia paniculata (Wall. ex Benth.) Thoth.
 Christia parviflora (Schindl.) Bakh.f.
 Christia pierrei (Schindl.) Ohashi
 Christia vespertilionis (L.f.) Bakh.f.
 Christia zollingeri (Schindl.) Bakh.f.

References

Desmodieae
Fabaceae genera